The locomotives of the Somerset and Dorset Joint Railway can be broken down into four eras:
 The period of independence up to 1874;
 The period of joint ownership when Samuel Waite Johnson was Locomotive Superintendent for the Midland Railway (1875–1906);
 The period when Henry Fowler was Locomotive Superintendent of the Midland Railway, and later Chief Mechanical Engineer if its successor, the London, Midland and Scottish Railway (1907–1929);
 The period after 1930 when the locomotives had been absorbed into the stock of the LMS (1930–1966).

The railway had a locomotive, carriage and wagon works at Highbridge, Somerset, but this closed in 1930. Note that the locomotive history of the Somerset and Dorset Joint Railway is complicated by the many reboilerings, rebuildings, and renumberings, not all of which are captured in the table.

Early era

Johnson era

Fowler era

LMS era

References

 
Somerset and Dorset
Somerset and Dorset
Somerset and Dorset Joint Railway